The Sun Odyssey 519 is a French sailboat that was designed by Philippe Briand and the Jeanneau Design Office, as a cruiser and was first built in 2015.

The design is a development of the Sun Odyssey 509 with a wider swimming platform and a bowsprit.

Production
The design was built by Jeanneau in France, from 2015 to 2019, but it is now out of production.

Design
The Sun Odyssey 519 is a recreational keelboat, built predominantly of fiberglass, with wood trim. It has a fractional sloop rig, with a deck-stepped mast, two sets of swept spreaders and aluminum spars with 1X19 stainless steel wire rigging. The hull has a raked stem, a reverse transom with a drop-down tailgate swimming platform, an internally mounted spade-type rudder controlled by dual wheels and a fixed "L"-shaped fin keel with a weighted bulb or optional shoal-draft keel. The fin keel model displaces  empty and carries  of cast iron ballast, while the shoal draft version displaces  empty and carries  of cast iron ballast.

The design has sleeping accommodation for six to ten people in three to five cabins. The three cabin interior has a double island berth in the bow cabin, a "U"-shaped settee and a straight double seat in the main cabin and two aft cabins, each with a double berth. The bow cabin may be divided into two smaller cabins, each with a "V"-berth. Also a small aft crew cabin with two bunk beds may be added aft on the starboard side. The galley is located on the starboard side, amidships. The galley is of a straight configuration and is equipped with a four-burner stove, a refrigerator, freezer and a double sink. A navigation station is opposite the galley, on the port side. There are two heads, one in the bow cabin on the port side and one on the port side, aft. Up to four heads may be fitted in the four cabin interior, two forward and two aft.

Operational history
The boat is supported by an active class club, the Jeanneau Owners Network.

See also
List of sailing boat types

References

External links

Video review of the Sun Odyssey 519

Keelboats
2010s sailboat type designs
Sailing yachts
Sailboat type designs by Philippe Briand
Sailboat type designs by Jeanneau Design Office
Sailboat types built by Jeanneau